Work Out New York is an American reality television series which premiered on December 6, 2015, on Bravo. Announced in April 2014 as The Fit Club, the reality series follows fitness trainers working in New York City who all compete in order to attract wealthy and famous clients. The final episode of season 1 aired on January 31, 2016, with 732,000 viewers.

Episodes

Broadcast
Internationally, the series premiered in Australia on Arena on December 7, 2015.

References

External links

 
 

2010s American reality television series
2015 American television series debuts
2016 American television series endings
Bravo (American TV network) original programming
English-language television shows
Television series by All3Media
Television shows set in New York City